Metz Ice Plant, also known as Jacob Klaer Gristmill and Milford Ice and Refrigeration Company, is a historic ice manufacturing plant located in the Delaware Water Gap National Recreation Area at Milford, Pike County, Pennsylvania.  It consists of a late-19th century grist mill converted to an ice manufacturing plant.  The oldest section was built in 1869, and is a -story wood-frame building with a gambrel roof.  Attached to it are two wood frame additions, the first built between 1903 and 1927.  Five smaller additions are of concrete block construction and built between 1927 and 1950.  Also extant is a penstock that carried water to the plant.  The former grist mill was renovated to be an ice plant between 1924 and 1930.  It remained in operation into the 1950s.

It was added to the National Register of Historic Places in 2007.

See also
 List of ice companies

References

Industrial buildings and structures on the National Register of Historic Places in Pennsylvania
Industrial buildings completed in 1869
Buildings and structures in Pike County, Pennsylvania
Ice companies
1869 establishments in Pennsylvania
National Register of Historic Places in Pike County, Pennsylvania
Delaware Water Gap National Recreation Area